Walter Ferdinand Friedlaender (March 10, 1873 – September 8, 1966) was a German art historian (who should not be confused with Max Jakob Friedländer).

Walter Friedlaender was the son of Sigismund Friedlaender and Anna Joachimsthal. Born in Glogau, he was taught art history by Heinrich Wölfflin and others. Among his first students was Erwin Panofsky.

He taught at the Freiburg University (1914–1933), and the Institute of Fine Arts at New York University (1935-1966).

According to architecture and art historian Rocky Ruggiero, in a seminal observation about Mannerism by Friedlaender in his work, Mannerism and Anti-mannerism in Italian Painting, he presented the most sophisticated explanation of the transition from Renaissance art into the modern subjective "-isms" that followed the Baroque synthesis of Renaissance and High Renaissance styles. The concept Friedlaender presented was that artists moved from the objective and scientific work of Leonardo Da Vinci to the subjective presentations that have followed the break with Classical styles.  

Friedlaender died in New York.

Works 
 David to Delacroix, 1952
 Caravaggio Studies, 1955
 Mannerism and Anti-mannerism in Italian Painting, 1957  
 Mannerism and Anti-mannerism in Italian Painting, 1965
 Poussin. The Library of Great Painters. 1964. Harry N. Abrams, Inc., Publishers. New York, N.Y. 204 pp.

References

External links 
 Dictionary of Art Historians: "Walter Friedlaender" (English)
 Guide to the Papers of Walter Friedlaender (1873–1966) at the Leo Baeck Institute, New York  

1873 births
1966 deaths
German art historians
New York University faculty
German expatriates in the United States
People from Głogów
People from the Province of Silesia
German male non-fiction writers
Jewish emigrants from Nazi Germany to the United States